The Malcolm Jones was an American automobile manufactured in Detroit from 1914 to 1915.

History 
The first model was a cyclecar that used a V-twin engine with belt drive and had tandem seating. Only prototypes were built. A larger 4-cylinder model with shaft drive followed in 1915 and called the Malcolm, but production ended in the same year.

References
Defunct motor vehicle manufacturers of the United States
Cyclecars
Motor vehicle manufacturers based in Michigan
Defunct manufacturing companies based in Michigan

Brass Era vehicles
1910s cars
Cars introduced in 1914
Vehicle manufacturing companies established in 1914
Vehicle manufacturing companies disestablished in 1915